The Cleveland Short Line Railway is a freight bypass around southern Cleveland, Ohio, in the United States.  A quasi-independent railroad organized by major shareholders of the Lake Shore and Michigan Southern Railway, the shortline was intended to allow the Lake Shore and Michigan Southern to bypass the congested railroads in downtown Cleveland. The Cleveland Short Line has had a succession of owners, and is currently part of CSX Transportation.

History

Construction and merger with the Central
The Cleveland Short Line Railway was chartered November 24, 1902. The incorporators, who were major shareholders in the Lake Shore and Michigan Southern Railway (LS&MS), intended to construct a circumferential railroad from the LS&MS main line on the border between the Riverside and Bellaire-Puritas neighborhoods of Cleveland (an area known to railroads as "Rockport") to the LS&MS rail yard in Collinwood, Ohio.

Construction began in May 1906. The first  section, from Rockport to the Lake Erie and Pittsburgh Railway (a block south of the intersection of Broadway and Harvard Avenues in the Slavic Village neighborhood, an area known to railroads as "Marcy") opened on February 24, 1910.

On April 1, 1911, the LS&MS entered into a 99-year lease of the Cleveland Short Line. The lease required the LS&MS to pay to the Cleveland Short Line each year an amount equal to 5 percent of its outstanding capital stock plus an amount equal to the interest on the Short Line's outstanding debt. The remaining  of the line opened on July 1, 1912. By December 31, 1913, the LS&MS had purchased all the outstanding stock of the Cleveland Short Line.

The LS&MS merged with the New York Central Railroad (NYC) in December 1914, and the NYC absorbed the Cleveland Short Line in 1915.

Later history
The New York Central Railroad merged with the Pennsylvania Railroad on February 1, 1968, to create the Penn Central Transportation Company ("Penn Central"). The Penn Central declared bankruptcy on June 21, 1970. The Penn Central continued to operate into 1974, until President Richard Nixon signed the Regional Rail Reorganization Act on January 2. Most (but not all) of the Penn Central's tracks were turned over to a new corporation, Conrail. The Penn Central continued to operate as a freight-only railroad, but reorganization efforts failed. In March 1976, the Railroad Revitalization and Regulatory Reform Act folded the remainder of the Penn Central into Conrail as well.

Of those railroads which had trackage rights to use the bypass, more than half used only that portion of the line west of the former Pennsylvania Railroad's Cleveland and Pittsburgh Railroad (then Conrail's Cleveland Line).

In 1997, Conrail was jointly purchased by CSX and the Norfolk Southern Railway. CSX obtained the Cleveland Short Line. The Cleveland Short Line east of Short Line Junction is now CSX's Short Line Subdivision.

Original route
The track grade was an extremely light 0.3 percent.

The Cleveland Short Line connected with the Lake Shore & Southern Michigan at West Park; with the Cleveland, Cincinnati, Chicago and St. Louis Railway at Linndale; with the Cleveland, Lorain & Wheeling Railroad at Parma; with the Lake Erie and Pittsburgh Railway; with the Newburgh and South Shore Railroad at Newburgh; with the Baltimore & Ohio, the Lake Erie & Pittsburgh, the Cleveland & Pittsburgh, and the Wheeling & Lake Erie in southeast Cleveland; and with the New York, Chicago & St. Louis (the "Nickel Plate") in eastern Cleveland. It had trackage rights on the Nickel Plate to the Collinwood yard for the Lake Shore and Southern Michigan. No at-grade crossings of streets were permitted, requiring either bridges or tunnels at numerous parts of the line.

The entire route consisted of four tracks, except over the bridge spanning the Cuyahoga River. The right of way permitted the line to be expanded to six tracks.

See also
Cleveland Belt and Terminal Railroad, a closer-in bypass owned by the Wheeling and Lake Erie Railway
Cleveland railroad history

References

Bibliography

For further reading

Defunct Ohio railroads
Companies affiliated with the Lake Shore and Michigan Southern Railway
Predecessors of the New York Central Railroad
Railway companies established in 1902
Railway companies disestablished in 1915
Rail transportation in Cleveland